Stagecoach is a town in Montgomery County, Texas, United States. The population was 538 at the 2010 census.

History
In the 19th century the community was a stop on a stagecoach route. Farms were later established in the area, and what would become Stagecoach was a farm owned by W. L. Swinley. The Stagecoach residential development was established in 1958. In the 1960s the civic club opened. An unofficial mayor was elected in 1974. By 1980 108 residences were inside the community. It was incorporated that year. The community grew to 340 in 1990 and 455 in 2000.

Geography

Stagecoach is located at  (30.142858, –95.711232).

The street names reflect the city's history. They include: "Boot Hill," "Broken Spoke," "Cimarron," "Indian Springs," "Old Coach," "Silver Spur," "Surrey," "Tomahawk," and "Wagon Wheel." Lake Apache and Lake Hardin, located along Sulphur Creek, are Stagecoach's artificial lakes.

Demographics

As of the census of 2010, there were 538 people, 155 households, and 137 families residing in the town. The population density was 399.9 people per square mile (154.1/km2). There were 162 housing units at an average density of 142.4 per square mile (54.9/km2). The racial makeup of the town was 96.48% White, 0.44% African American, 0.22% Native American, and 2.86% from two or more races. Hispanic or Latino of any race were 4.40% of the population.

There were 155 households, out of which 38.7% had children under the age of 18 living with them, 80.6% were married couples living together, 5.8% had a female householder with no husband present, and 11.0% were non-families. 9.0% of all households were made up of individuals, and 3.9% had someone living alone who was 65 years of age or older. The average household size was 2.94 and the average family size was 3.11.

In the town, the population was spread out, with 26.8% under the age of 18, 5.5% from 18 to 24, 28.4% from 25 to 44, 31.6% from 45 to 64, and 7.7% who were 65 years of age or older. The median age was 41 years. For every 100 females, there were 92.8 males. For every 100 females age 18 and over, there were 93.6 males.

The median income for a household in the town was $68,750, and the median income for a family was $76,353. Males had a median income of $58,750 versus $37,614 for females. The per capita income for the town was $30,128. About 5.5% of families and 5.8% of the population were below the poverty line, including 3.1% of those under age 18 and 1.9% of those age 65 or over.

Education
About half of Stagecoach residents are zoned to schools in the Magnolia Independent School District.  The other southern half is zoned to Tomball Independent School District.

References

Towns in Montgomery County, Texas
Towns in Texas
Greater Houston